Mittenwald station is a railway station in the German State of Bavaria, in the town of Mittenwald. It has three platform tracks and is classified by Deutsche Bahn (DB) as a category 4 station.
 
It is the first station in Bavaria north of the Austria-Germany border on the Garmisch-Partenkirchen–Innsbruck line (Mittenwald Railway). The station was opened in 1912 and is served by trains operated by both Deutsche Bahn and Austrian Federal Railways (ÖBB).

The station is 18 kilometres from Garmisch-Partenkirchen station and 38 kilometres from Innsbruck West station (de).

Description 
The station lies to the east of the town centre, with which it is connected by Bahnhofstraße. The station building was modernised and renovated in 2012, in time for the celebrations of Mittenwald Railway's 100th anniversary. The building contains a ticket office, a public toilet, a small shop with a café, and also a pharmacy.

The station has four tracks, three of which are adjacent to passenger platforms. Platform 1 adjoins the station building, while platforms 2 and 3 are on an island accessible via lift and stairways.

Several local bus services, including routes from Seefeld in Tirol across the border, stop at the station.

A car parking, a bicycle parking facility and a taxi rank are outside the station on Bahnhofplatz.

The bottom station of Karwendelbahn, a cable car connecting Mittenwald with Westliche Karwendelspitze mountain, is a 10-minute walk to the east of the station.

Rail services

As of January 2018, the typical off-peak services from the station are:

1 tph (train per hour) to Munich via Garmisch-Partenkirchen. Most of these services originate in Mittenwald, but some are through trains from Seefeld in Tirol or Innsbruck in Austria. Several trains originating in Austria and operated by ÖBB terminate at Garmisch-Partenkirchen;
1 tph to Seefeld in Tirol, some of them continuing to Innsbruck.

Overall, there are four trains a day in each direction following the entire Munich–Innsbruck route. All the others are either DB services between Munich and Mittenwald or Seefeld, or ÖBB services between Innsbruck and Garmisch-Partenkirchen.

Furthermore there is an ICE-Service with a connection to Dortmund and Innsbruck on Sundays since 2010.

References

Railway stations in Bavaria
Buildings and structures in Garmisch-Partenkirchen (district)
Railway stations in Germany opened in 1912